is a train station located in Kurume, Fukuoka.

Lines 
Nishi-Nippon Railroad
Tenjin Ōmuta Line

Platforms

Adjacent stations

Surrounding area
 Mizuma Library
 Yasumoto Hospital
 Mizuma General Gymnasium
 Inutsuka Elementary School
 Nishimatsuya Chain Co., Ltd Mizuma Store
 Pachinko

Railway stations in Fukuoka Prefecture
Railway stations in Japan opened in 1937